Chae Hyung-won (born January 15, 1994), mononymously as Hyungwon, is a South Korean singer, dancer, actor, model, DJ, songwriter, and producer. In 2015, he debuted in the South Korean boy group Monsta X, through the Mnet's survival show No.Mercy, under Starship Entertainment. In 2017, he began performing as a DJ, under the stage name DJ H.ONE.

Career

Early life and debut 

Hyungwon was born in Gwangju, South Korea on January 15, 1994.

In 2014, while being a trainee at Starship Entertainment, he worked as a model for various fashion shows, such as W Hotel and Ceci Fashion Show.

Beginning in December 2014, he competed in the Mnet's survival show No.Mercy, through which he debuted in the new hip-hop boy group Monsta X.

2015–2019: Monsta X, DJ work and solo activities

On May 14, Hyungwon debuted with Monsta X upon the release of their first EP Trespass.

In January 2016, he appeared in K.Will's music video "You Call It Romance", where his performance gained praise for giving the music video a drama-like atmosphere.

The following year, in March 2017, Hyungwon made his official acting debut with Please Find Her, airing on KBS2. He played the supporting role of Jeon Ik-soo.

In May, Hyungwon began activities as a DJ, using the stage name DJ H.ONE, and performed a special stage in the KCON event KCON 2017 Japan, along with DJ Justin Oh, held at Makuhari Messe in Tokyo.

On June 10, he and DJ Justin Oh also appeared and performed together in the EDM festival Ultra Music Festival Korea, held at Jamsil Olympic Stadium in Seoul. 

In September, Hyungwon's first single was in collaboration with DJ Justin Oh, titled "BAM!BAM!BAM!", which featured fellow group member Jooheon.

In December, he released a single as part of his work on the TV show Mix and the City, with DJ Justin Oh as producer, titled "1(One)", as well as the single "Just One More", produced by Cash Cash, with Jessi, Hyomin, Tritops, Jimin, and Xie.

In June 2018, Hyungwon once again was featured in the EDM festival Ultra Music Festival Korea, held at Everland Speedway in Seoul. 

In July, he released the single "My Name", which featured Talksick, in collaboration with Dutch DJ Jimmy Clash.

Hyungwon collaborated with Hongbin and the producer dress for Pepsi's The Love of Summer: The Performance, releasing the song "Cool Love" on July 10, 2019.

2020–present: Expanding in songwriting and other solo activities
In 2020, Hyungwon participated in the writing, composing, and arranging for the song "Nobody Else" for Monsta X's album Fatal Love. He collaborated again with Justin Oh for the track, and it is the first song in which he was involved in each aspect of the song production. It was noted for showing Hyungwon's musical range when composing music, being so distinct in style from his EDM tracks as a DJ. In January 2021, the song charted at number ten on the Billboard World Digital Song Sales chart.

In June 2021, Hyungwon and Minhyuk were selected as new cast members for Youtube channel Inssa Oppa. For the show, they transformed into different "sub-characters" for each episode to introduce the latest trends and G-Market global shop products in entertainment format. 

In July, Hyungwon with other Monsta X members' Shownu and I.M joined Pepsi's Taste of Korea summer campaign, releasing a promotional single "Summer Taste", alongside Rain, Brave Girls members' Yujeong and Yuna, and Ateez members' Hongjoong and Yunho. 

In August, MBC's Idol Radio announced its second season to begin airing on August 9, with Hyungwon as a DJ alongside his group member Joohoney. The program is live streamed through Universe and aired through MBC Radio.

In November, Hyungwon starred in the new KakaoTV musical web series Fly Again as Han Yo-han, his first-ever lead role. It revolved around how he changed his dream, from being a genius dancer to becoming an idol upon meeting the school's dance club "Villainz". In December, he released an OST for the web series, titled "Picture", a dance song.

In March 2022, Hyungwon and Minhyuk returned for the sixth season of Inssa Oppa. For this season, they focused on a concept of "what if" and perform situational plays on various themes, moving freely to any desired time, such as the past, present, and future. He tested positive for COVID-19 on March 28. 

In September, Hyungwon was cast as the main character in the new JTBC drama President Idol Mart, alongside Exo's Xiumin and Lee Shin-young, produced by The Great Show. It is a drama depicting episodes that occur while former members of an idol group run a mart. On September 30, he attended the DJing party 2022 DG Night, held at the Martini Bar of Dolce & Gabbana, as well as participating in the Tommy Hilfiger's pop-up store in Cheongdam-dong, Seoul, to showcase a capsule collection in collaboration with Richard Quinn, winner of the "Queen Elizabeth II British Design Award", alongside Twice's Nayeon.

On October 20, Hyungwon hosted and performed at MBC's Idol Radios first overseas concert Idol Radio Live in Tokyo, alongside his group member Joohoney and Got7's Youngjae, with several other artists, held at Tokyo Garden Theater in Tokyo.

In January 2023, he attended the collaboration event of Louis Vuitton and Yayoi Kusama, held in Gangnam-gu, Seoul.

In February, Hyungwon and Minhyuk attended the home appliance brand Dyson Style Lab pop-up store's opening ceremony, held in Seoul. He had a cover pictorial and interview for the ninth issue of Y Magazine, titled "Keep Calm and Carry On".

Public image and impact
Hyungwon, as an individual and a member of Monsta X, is expanding his field of activity and is making a trending move as an "all-rounder". He has boasted of "excellent model fit" by digesting various concepts, is also receiving a rush of love calls from the industry, such as advertising models, various pictorials, beauty, fashion, and catering as if proving his infinite potential as a solo artist. He participated in various festivals, proving his high-quality DJing skills, along with acting in various shows. Hyungwon, having a limitless spectrum of music, acting, and DJing, is being reborn as an "all-rounder" from "global trend".

Hyungwon appeared on Lee Young-ji's web entertainment show I Haven't Set Up, released on August 12. Although his appearance was not for publicity purposes, it is loved by many people, surpassing 4.6 million views within three days of being released, such as recording the number one video on YouTube everyday. He also became the hot topic and went viral in every social media platforms because of his visuals and humor, performing as a "complete all-rounder". His episode also ranked first on YouTube's most popular video for three days in a row and surpassed 5 million views within four days of being released.

Hyungwon started producing and working on external songs, as he composed, wrote, and arranged for AB6IX's song "Complicated", from the group's sixth EP Take a Chance. He also composed, wrote, and arranged two songs, "Bad Liar" and "Where Is This Love", for fellow group member Kihyun's first EP Youth. Hyungwon participated as a producer in the American sports-themed beverage and food products brand Gatorade's campaign advertisement music (featuring Kim Yuna and Lee Dong-gook).

Other ventures

Ambassadorship
In November 2021, as part of Monsta X's promotional campaign for traditional Korean culture, Hyungwon and Minhyuk participated in a video narration for the YouTube series Kimchi Universe 3, jointly produced by Daesang Jonggajib and World Kimchi Research Institute together with Professor Seo Kyung-duk of Sungshin Women's University. The video explains how kimchi became known all over the world through the 1986 Asian Games and 1988 Seoul Olympics, culminating with Gimjang, the traditional practice of preparing and preserving kimchi, being registered on the UNESCO Intangible Cultural Heritage of Humanity in 2013.

Endorsements
In 2019, Hyungwon alongside VIXX's Hongbin became the Korean representatives for the global beverage brand Pepsi's "The Love of Summer" campaign.

In 2021, he joined Pepsi's "Taste of Korea" summer campaign, alongside Rain, Monsta X members' Shownu and I.M, Brave Girls members' Yujeong and Yuna, and Ateez members' Hongjoong and Yunho. In July, Hyungwon has also been selected as new model for the Korean cosmetic brand Wellage through the Korean star and style magazine AtStyle.

In July 2022, he became the model for the French premium mineral water brand Evian. The company also launches a limited edition collection with the beagle character Snoopy. In August, Hyungwon became the model for the French cosmetic brand Avène through the Korean fashion, beauty, and life magazine Singles. In October, he became a model of the American denim jeans brand Lee's winter collection through the fashion magazine W Korea. On November 6, Hyungwon renewed his model contract for the Korean cosmetic brand Wellage.

Philanthropy
In January 2022, Hyungwon donated 00,000 through the idol fandom community service My Favorite Idol, for his birthday. It will be delivered to the Miral Welfare Foundation and used as fund for the disabled who are isolated due to COVID-19. On March 30, he donated ,000,000 through Yeouldol, a non-profit organization that helps children with rare diseases, together with Wellage. On October 28, Hyungwon attended the fashion magazine W Koreas breast cancer awareness campaign "Love Your W" charity event, with his group member Minhyuk, held at the Four Seasons Hotel in Gwanghwamun, Seoul.

In February 2023, he joined in the cover project for fashion magazine Marie Claire Koreas "Happy Marie Birthday" campaign, to support UNICEF's drinking water sanitation project and Save the Children's psychological and emotional support project for domestic and foreign abused children and those children exposed to various risks, in celebration of its 30th anniversary, with the French jewellery and watch brand Fred.

Discography

Singles

As lead artist

Promotional singles

Soundtrack appearances

Other appearances

Music videos

Filmography

Drama

Web series

Television shows

Web shows

Radio shows

Music video appearances

Songwriting 
All credits are adapted from the Korea Music Copyright Association, unless stated otherwise.

Awards and nominations

Notes

References

External links 

 

1994 births
21st-century South Korean  male singers
Living people
People from Gwangju
English-language singers from South Korea
Japanese-language singers of South Korea
South Korean DJs
South Korean male idols
South Korean male models
South Korean pop singers
South Korean male actors
Starship Entertainment artists
Monsta X members